Mostovsky is a rural locality (a khutor) in Tryasinovskoye Rural Settlement, Serafimovichsky District, Volgograd Oblast, Russia. The population was 97 as of 2010. There are 4 streets.

Geography 
Mostovsky is located 12 km south of Serafimovich (the district's administrative centre) by road. 2-y Bobrovsky is the nearest rural locality.

References 

Rural localities in Serafimovichsky District